Possumtrot Branch is a stream in Walker County, in the U.S. state of Georgia. It is a tributary to Duck Creek.

It is speculated the name Possumtrot carries a negative connotation for an "uninteresting location".

See also
List of rivers of Georgia (U.S. state)

References

Rivers of Walker County, Georgia
Rivers of Georgia (U.S. state)